Tirumala Tirupati Devasthanams is the official trust managing all the activities of Venkateswara Temple, Tirumala, Tirupati in the Indian state of Andhra Pradesh. It is headquartered at Tirupati. Along with Venkateswara Swamy Temple in Tirumala it also manages many other temples in Tirupati and all around the world.

In Tirupati  City

 Venkateswara Temple, Tirumala
 Padmavathi Temple, Tiruchanur
 Alipiri padala mandapam
 Govindaraja Temple, Tirupati
 Kapileswara Temple, Kapilatheertham
 Kodandarama Temple, Tirupati 
 Kalyana Venkateswara Temple, Srinivasamangapuram
 Vakula matha Temple, Perur
 Surya Narayana Temple, Tiruchanur
 Prasanna Venkateswara Temple, Appalayagunta
 Varahaswamy Temple, Tirumala
 Kodandarama Temple, Chandragiri
 Sri Bhu Sameta Venkateswara Temple, Thondamanadu
 Srinivasa Temple, Tiruchanur
 Sri Varaha Swamy Temple,Tirumala
 Anjanadri,Tirumala
 Japali Anjaneya Swamy Temple,Tirumala

In Andhra pradesh

Historical Temples
Tirupati district, Andhra Pradesh
 Kalyana Venkateswara Temple, Narayanavanam
 Vedanarayana Temple, Nagalapuram
 Avanakshamma Temple, Narayanavanam
 Karimanikyaswamy Temple, Tummuru
 Neelakantheswara Temple, Tummuru

Chittoor district, Andhra Pradesh
 Venugopalaswamy Temple, Karvetinagaram
 Sri Pattabhirama Temple, Valmikipuram
 Kariyamanikya Temple, Nagari
 Karivaradaraja Temple, Satravada
 Annapurna sametha Kashi Visweswara Temple, Buggaagraharam
 Lakshmi Narasimha Temple, Tarigonda
 Prasanna Venkateswara Temple, Kosuvaripalle
 Konetirayala Temple, Keelapatla
 Sri venkateswara Swami Temple,
Mangalampeta

Kadapa district, Andhra Pradesh
 Kodandarama Temple, Vontimitta
 Veeranjaneya Temple, Gandi
 Narapura Venkateswara Temple, Jammalamadugu
 Lakshmi Venkateswara Temple, Devunigadapa

Annamayya district, Andhra Pradesh
 Siddeswara Temple, Thallapaka
 Chennakesava Temple, Thallapaka

Prakasam district, Andhra Pradesh
  Kondanda Ramalayam, Muppavaram

Guntur district, Andhra Pradesh
 Sri Venkateswara Temple, Ananthavaram

Eluru district, Andhra Pradesh
 Seetharamaswamy Temple, Saripalli

Kakinada district, Andhra Pradesh
 Padmavathi sametha Venkateswara Temple, Pithapuram

Anakapalle district, Andhra Pradesh
 Sri Venugopala Swami Temple, Upamaka

Temples constructed by TTD

India
 Sri Venkateswara Temple, New Delhi 
 Tirumala Tirupati Devastanams Andhra Ashram, Rishikesh, Uttarakhand
 Hyderabad (Telangana)
 Visakhapatnam (Andhra Pradesh)
 Bengaluru (Karnataka)
 Chennai  (Tamil Nadu)
 Mumbai (Maharashtra)
 Kurukshetra(Haryana)
 Vellore (Tamil Nadu)
 Kanyakumari (Tamil Nadu)
 Bhubaneshwar (Odisha)
 Amaravathi (Andhra Pradesh)
 Sri Padmavathi Devi Temple, Chennai (Tamil Nadu) - Under construction
 Jammu (Jammu & Kashmir) - Under construction
 Ulundurpet (Tamil Nadu) - Under construction

Abroad
Ohio (U.S.)

References

General references
Tirumala Tirupati Devasthanams->Temples. "Tirumala Tirupati Devasthanams"

Tirupati
Tirumala Venkateswara Temple
Tirumala Tirupati Devasthanams